Dolní Poustevna in Děčín District in the Ústí nad Labem Region of the Czech Republic. It has about 1,700 inhabitants.

Administrative parts
The town part of Horní Poustevna and villages of Karlín, Marketa and Nová Víska are administrative parts of Dolní Poustevna.

Transport
The Dolní Poustevna railway station lies on the railway line from Děčín to Rumburk.

Twin towns – sister cities

Dolní Poustevna is twinned with:
 Sebnitz, Germany

Reference

External links

Cities and towns in the Czech Republic
Populated places in Děčín District